Parakrama Bahu Epa was King of Gampola who ruled from 1409 to 1412. He succeeded Vira Alakesvara as king and was the last to reign in Gampola.

See also
 List of Sri Lankan monarchs
 History of Sri Lanka

References

External links
 Kings & Rulers of Sri Lanka
 Codrington's Short History of Ceylon

Monarchs of Gampola
House of Siri Sanga Bo
P
P